Bas Sibum (born 26 December 1982, in Nieuw-Amsterdam) is a Dutch former professional footballer who played as a defensive midfielder. He made his debut in professional football, being part of the FC Emmen squad in the 2000–01 season. He also played for FC Twente, Roda JC, NEC, Alemannia Aachen, SK Beveren and Heracles Almelo.

References

External links
 Voetbal International profile 

1982 births
Living people
Dutch footballers
Dutch expatriate footballers
FC Emmen players
FC Twente players
Roda JC Kerkrade players
NEC Nijmegen players
Alemannia Aachen players
S.K. Beveren players
Heracles Almelo players
Eredivisie players
Eerste Divisie players
2. Bundesliga players
Belgian Pro League players
Expatriate footballers in Germany
Association football midfielders
Footballers from Emmen, Netherlands